Jamie Campbell (born 24 March 1992) is a Scottish footballer who plays as a midfielder. He has previously played in the Scottish First Division with Partick Thistle, and in the Scottish Second Division during loan spells with both Stenhousemuir and Stranraer.

Career

Having been part of the Partick Thistle youth set-up, he was signed in 2009 on the Modern Apprentice scheme. Making his first team debut as a substitute in the Scottish Cup on 20 November 2010 against Stirling Albion. Going on to score his first ever professional goal during a 6-1 home win against Stirling Albion on 15 January 2011. Jamie's contract was not renewed after 2013 and he made the choice to drop down to Junior football and play for Clydebank. He has also began a career as an officer in the Merchant Navy. After two years with Clydebank he transferred to his hometown team, Greenock Juniors. He spent the 2017–18 season with West of Scotland First Division club Largs Thistle.

Career statistics

External links

References

1992 births
Living people
Scottish footballers
Scottish Football League players
Scottish Junior Football Association players
Partick Thistle F.C. players
Stenhousemuir F.C. players
Stranraer F.C. players
Clydebank F.C. players
Greenock Juniors F.C. players
Largs Thistle F.C. players
Association football midfielders